Bobble Keyboard is an input method app for Android and iOS devices founded in 2015 by Ankit Prasad and Mohd. Wassem. It was developed and produced by Talent Unlimited Online Services Private Limited.

Funding
In its history, Bobble has received funding from SAIF Partners, Deep Kalra (founder of MakeMyTrip), Amit Ranjan (co-founder of SlideShare), and Sachin & Binny Bansal (founders of Flipkart). It raised 3 rounds of funding between 2014 and 2016.

Features
Bobble makes use of a self-learning algorithm to create personalized content for its users. Bobble started off as a selfie-based sticker app, but over time more features were added. It has a facial recognition feature, used to convert selfies into GIFs and stickers. Its other features includes multilingual language support, glide typing, custom fonts, themes, voice typing and autocorrection. The application works in compatibility with platforms such as Facebook, Snapchat and Whatsapp Messenger. Bobble's features work in real-time with its ability to match facial expressions, head and facial tone with the sticker's emotion, theme and body.

Bobble is available in over 150 countries, including India, Ireland, New Zealand, UK, United States, Canada, Australia & Singapore.

Associations
In 2016, Bobble collaborated with Indus OS to become its official distributor in India.

In 2017, Bobble partnered with Gionee India and was promoted on the Gionee app store. It also became the default keyboard for Zen Mobile handsets.

It has collaborated with brands such as Tinder, Zomato, Apple Inc., Foxconn, Eros Now and Baidu.

Reception
During its initial release in India, Bobble has been downloaded more than 6 million times in a span of 15 months. In July 2017, Bobble topped the indic keyboards category on the Google Play Store, being ranked first in India and second globally.

Since 2015, it has been downloaded over 10 million times  and it crossed a tally of 1.5 million active users by December of that year. As of 2017, the app is listed on Play Store's "top 150 most engaging apps globally".

References

Android (operating system) software
Computer-related introductions in 2015
IOS software
Input methods
Android virtual keyboards